BVI  may refer to:
 British Virgin Islands
 Beaver County Airport, an airport near Beaver, PA with FAA LID code BVI
 Birdsville Airport, IATA airport code "BVI"
 Buena Vista International, a former division of The Walt Disney Company
 Euronext stock market code for Bureau Veritas
 Body volume index, a term used in anthropometry
 Blind and/or visually impaired
 Blade-vortex interaction

See also
 B6 (disambiguation), including a list of topics named B.VI, etc.